The Grand Rapids, Newaygo and Lake Shore Railroad is a defunct railroad which operated in the state of Michigan between 1872 and 1881. The GRN&LS was chartered on September 11, 1869, under the leadership of David P. Clay. The company operated a  line between Grand Rapids and White Cloud (where it joined the Chicago & Michigan Lake Shore). The initial segment, from Grand Rapids to Sparta, was completed on May 19, 1872. The line reached Newaygo on September 11, 1872; the first passenger train between the two towns ran the same day, to much fanfare from the local populace. On September 24, 1875 the line was extended over the Muskegon River to White Cloud. On September 30, 1881, it consolidated with other companies to form the Chicago & West Michigan. During its twelve years of independent existence the company sustained a net loss of $36,554.28.

Notes

References 

Railway companies established in 1869
Railway companies disestablished in 1881
Defunct Michigan railroads
West Michigan
Companies based in Grand Rapids, Michigan
Predecessors of the Pere Marquette Railway
1869 establishments in Michigan
American companies disestablished in 1881
American companies established in 1869